Heavenly Bodies is a 1984 Canadian drama film directed by Lawrence Dane and written by Lawrence Dane and Ron Base. The film stars Cynthia Dale, Richard Rebiere, Walter George Alton, Laura Henry, Stuart Stone and Patricia Idlette. The film was released on February 1, 1985, by Metro-Goldwyn-Mayer.

Samantha quits her job to open her own aerobics studio and competes with a larger club's lead instructor to become an instructor on a local fitness television show.

Cast 
Cynthia Dale as Samantha Blair
Richard Rebiere as Steve
Walter George Alton as Jack Pearson
Laura Henry as Debbie Martin
Stuart Stone as Joel Blair
Patricia Idlette as KC
Pam Henry as Patty
Linda Sorenson as T.V. Producer
Reiner Schwarz as T.V. Director
Cec Linder as Walter Matheson
Micki Moore as T.V. Reporter
Sean Sullivan as Real Estate Salesman
Mac Bradden as Nick
Michael Tait as Mr. Howard
Murray Westgate as Coach Hudson
Elena Kudaba as Babysitter
Sugar Bouche as Stripper
Andrew Douglas as Marathon Official
Brian Foley as Marathon Official
Fay Foley as Marathon Official
Howard Barish as Nervous Young Man
Eric Fink as Gorillagram
Reg Dreger as Chuck
Anne Lévy as Woman Interviewer
Dan Hennessey as Press Conference Reporter
Deborah Kimmet as Press Conference Reporter
Jo Bates as Girl in Locker Room
Marsha Levine as Girl in Locker Room

Soundtrack

The soundtrack to the film was released on LP, Cassette and CD (in Japan only with an additional song) in 1985 on the Private I Records in the USA. "The Beast In Me" (US R&B #87, US Dance #31), "At Last You're Mine" (US R&B #34), "Heaven" (Japan only), and "Breaking Out Of Prison" (South Africa only) were released as singles.

US LP and Cassette (Private I Records)
 "The Beast In Me" - Bonnie Pointer - 4:05
 "Breaking Out Of Prison" - Sparks –	 4:13
 "Out Of Control" - The Tubes - 3:24
 "At Last You're Mine" - Cheryl Lynn - 3:35
 "Look What You've Done To Me" - Marc Tanner - 3:07
 "Breakthrough" - Gary Wright - 3:58
 "Keep On Working" - Dwight Twilley - 3:39
 "Heaven" - Bonnie Pointer – 3:38
 "Love Always Wins" - Joe Lamont - 3:59
 "Into The Flow" - Boys Brigade - 3:45

Japan CD (Canyon)
 "Heaven" - Bonnie Pointer – 3:38
 "Breaking Out Of Prison" - Sparks –	 4:13
 "Out Of Control" - The Tubes - 3:24
 "At Last You're Mine" - Cheryl Lynn - 3:35
 "Work It" - Dazz Band - 4:31
 "Look What You've Done To Me" - Marc Tanner - 3:07
 "Breakthrough" - Gary Wright - 3:58
 "Keep On Working" - Dwight Twilley - 3:39
 "The Beast In Me" - Bonnie Pointer - 4:05
 "Love Always Wins" - Joe Lamont - 3:59
 "Into The Flow" - Boys Brigade - 3:45

References

External links 
 
 

1984 films
English-language Canadian films
Canadian drama films
1984 drama films
Metro-Goldwyn-Mayer films
1980s English-language films
1980s Canadian films